George Bell Timmerman Jr. (August 11, 1912November 29, 1994) was an American politician and World War II veteran who served as the 105th governor of South Carolina from 1955 to 1959. A member of the Democratic Party, he previously served as the state's 76th lieutenant governor from 1947 to 1955.

Life and career
Timmerman was born in Anderson County, the son of Mary Vandiver (Sullivan) and George Bell Timmerman Sr., a U.S. federal judge. He was raised in Charleston and graduated from The Citadel. After receiving a law degree from the University of South Carolina, he practiced law with his father in Batesburg. Timmerman enlisted in the U.S. Navy as an officer with the entry of the United States in World War II after the attack on Pearl Harbor.

Lieutenant Governor of South Carolina
Returning to South Carolina after the war, Timmerman ran as a Democrat for Lieutenant Governor in 1946 on the same ticket as fellow veteran Strom Thurmond. He was elected for a term beginning in 1947 and reelected in 1950 for another four-year term.

Gubernatorial tenure
While Governor he opposed the Supreme Court's ruling in 1954 declaring segregated public schools unconstitutional. Timmerman fought the changes brought by the decision to defend "the integrity of the races" and "our customs and institutions." He urged Congress to limit the authority of the United States Supreme Court. He regarded Northern insistence on racial integration as hypocritical.

In the gubernatorial election of 1954, he faced nominal opposition in the Democratic primary and ran unopposed in the general election becoming the 105th Governor of South Carolina in 1955. He sought to thwart an order by the Interstate Commerce Commission for desegregation of long-distance travel in 1955, especially because it affected public waiting rooms. At the same time he opposed Federal court orders integrating public parks, bathing beaches and golf courses. For the desegregation of public schools, he vowed with other Southern Governors to thwart it with Congressional or state legislation.

He was the favorite presidential candidate of the South Carolina delegation at the 1956 Democratic National Convention. During the convention he was a leader of Southern opposition to what he called "radical civil rights legislation and radical planks in the platform." He signed a law in 1956 to bar members of the National Association for the Advancement of Colored People from public employment in South Carolina. He opposed civil rights laws enacted by the Eisenhower Administration.

Judicial appointment and retirement
After leaving the governorship in 1959, Timmerman was appointed as a judge to the state's Eleventh Judicial Circuit in 1967 and served until 1984. While a judge, Timmerman declared the 1974 South Carolina law on capital punishment to be unconstitutional. This ruling was affirmed in the 1976 U.S. Supreme Court decision Gregg v. Georgia.

He died on November 29, 1994, in Batesburg-Leesville, South Carolina.

References

External links
SCIway Biography of George Bell Timmerman
USC Biography of George Bell Timmerman Jr.
George Bell Timmerman, Jr. Papers at South Carolina Political Collection at the University of South Carolina
Governor George Bell Timmerman, Jr. Collection at the South Carolina Department of Archives & History (RG 548000)

1912 births
1994 deaths
United States Navy personnel of World War II
American segregationists
The Citadel, The Military College of South Carolina alumni
Democratic Party governors of South Carolina
South Carolina lawyers
South Carolina state court judges
University of South Carolina alumni
University of South Carolina trustees
Candidates in the 1956 United States presidential election
20th-century American politicians
20th-century American lawyers
20th-century American judges
People from Batesburg-Leesville, South Carolina
United States Navy officers
Old Right (United States)
Military personnel from South Carolina